The contracting states to the Comprehensive Nuclear-Test-Ban Treaty (CTBT) are the states that have signed and ratified the international agreement banning all nuclear explosions in all environments. Technically they will not be "parties" until the treaty enters into force, at which point these states will also be Member States of the Comprehensive Nuclear-Test-Ban Treaty Organization (CTBTO), which comes into existence upon entry into force of the treaty. Non-contracting states are also listed, including those that are signatories and those are not. States Signatories are Members of the CTBTO Preparatory Commission.

On September 24, 1996, the Comprehensive Nuclear-Test-Ban Treaty (CTBT) was opened for signature. All five nuclear weapons states recognized under the Nuclear Non-Proliferation Treaty (China, France, Russia, the United Kingdom, and the United States) signed the treaty, with 66 other states following that day. Fiji became the first state to ratify the treaty on October 10, 1996. As of January 2023, 186 states have signed and 177 states have ratified the treaty. Most recently, Solomon Islands ratified the treaty in January 2023.

Signatures are received at the United Nations Headquarters in New York City by authorized representatives of the state. Ratification is achieved with the approval of either or both chamber of the legislature and executive of the state. The instrument of ratification serves as the document binding the state to the international treaty and can be accepted only with the validating signature of the head of state or other official with full powers to sign it. The instrument is deposited with the Secretary-General of the United Nations.

Under the CTBT, there are 195 Annex 1 states which include a subset of 44 Annex 2 states.
 Annex 1 states are agreed upon by conference and currently comprise all 193 United Nations member states, the Cook Islands, Holy See and Niue. All Annex 1 states may become members of the Executive Council, the principal decision-making body of the organization responsible for supervising its activities. These states are formally bound to the conditions of the treaty; however, their ratification is not necessary for the treaty to come into effect (unless they are also an Annex 2 state).
 Annex 2 states are those that formally participated in the 1996 Conference on Disarmament and possessed nuclear power or research reactors at the time. Annex 2 lists the following 44 States: Algeria, Argentina, Australia, Austria, Bangladesh, Belgium, Brazil, Bulgaria, Canada, Chile, China, Colombia, Democratic People's Republic of Korea, Democratic Republic of the Congo, Egypt, Finland, France, Germany, Hungary, India, Indonesia, Islamic Republic of Iran, Israel, Italy, Japan, Mexico, Netherlands, Norway, Pakistan, Peru, Poland, Republic of Korea, Romania, Russian Federation, Slovakia, South Africa, Spain, Sweden, Switzerland, Turkey, Ukraine, United Kingdom, United States of America, and Vietnam.
Eight Annex 2 states have not ratified the treaty: China, Egypt, Iran, Israel and the United States have already signed the Treaty, whereas India, North Korea and Pakistan have not signed it. The treaty will come into force only with the signature and ratification of the above Annex 2 states of the treaty, 180 days after they have all deposited their instruments of ratification.

Summary

Ratifying states

Signatory states
The following 9 states have signed but not ratified the treaty.

Non-signatory states
The following 10 UN member states, in addition to the UN observer State of Palestine, have neither signed nor acceded to the treaty.

Ratification progress
India
In 1998, India said it would only sign the treaty if the United States presented a schedule for eliminating its nuclear stockpile, a condition the United States rejected.

Israel
In 2016, Israeli Prime Minister Benjamin Netanyahu said that its ratification was dependent upon "the regional context and the appropriate timing".

United States
The United States has signed the CTBT, but not ratified it; there is ongoing debate whether to ratify the CTBT.

The United States has stated that its ratification of the CTBT is conditional upon:

Proponents of ratification claim that it would:

 Establish an international norm that would push other nuclear-capable countries like North Korea, Pakistan, and India to sign.
 Constrain worldwide nuclear proliferation by vastly limiting a country's ability to make nuclear advancements that only testing can ensure.
 Not compromise US national security because the Science Based Stockpile Stewardship Program serves as a means for maintaining current US nuclear capabilities without physical detonation.

Opponents of ratification claim that:
 The treaty is unverifiable and that other nations could easily cheat.
 The ability to enforce the treaty was dubious.
 The U.S. nuclear stockpile would not be as safe or reliable in the absence of testing.
 The benefit to nuclear nonproliferation was minimal.

On October 13, 1999, the United States Senate rejected ratification of the CTBT. During his 2008 presidential election campaign Barack Obama said that "As president, I will reach out to the Senate to secure the ratification of the CTBT at the earliest practical date." In his speech in Prague on April 5, 2009, he announced that "[To] achieve a global ban on nuclear testing, my administration will immediately and aggressively pursue U.S. ratification of the Comprehensive Test Ban Treaty. After more than five decades of talks, it is time for the testing of nuclear weapons to finally be banned."

An article in Bulletin of the Atomic Scientists describes how a North Korean underground nuclear test on May 25, 2009, was detected and the source located by GPS satellites. The authors suggest that the effectiveness of GPS satellites for detecting nuclear explosions enhances the ability to verify compliance with the Comprehensive Nuclear Test Ban Treaty, giving the United States more reason to ratify it.

See also 

 List of parties to the Biological Weapons Convention
 List of parties to the Chemical Weapons Convention
 List of parties to the Convention on Certain Conventional Weapons
 List of parties to the Ottawa Treaty
 List of parties to the Partial Nuclear Test Ban Treaty
 List of parties to the Treaty on the Non-Proliferation of Nuclear Weapons
 List of parties to the Treaty on the Prohibition of Nuclear Weapons
List of parties to weapons of mass destruction treaties

References

External links
Depository website with info on signatures and ratifications
Country Profiles on the CTBTO Preparatory Commission Website

Nuclear weapons governance
Nuclear weapons policy
Arms control treaties
Lists of parties to treaties
Parties
Nuclear technology-related lists